Thriller (also known as Boris Karloff's Thriller and Boris Karloff Presents) is an American anthology television series that aired during the 1960–61 and 1961–62 seasons on NBC. The show featured host Boris Karloff introducing a mix of macabre horror tales and suspense thrillers.

Overview 

Thriller was created by Hubbell Robinson for MCA's Revue Studios. Though remembered primarily as a series that emphasized gothic horror, under producer Fletcher Markle Thriller was initially a series oriented towards suspense and crime drama, in the manner of Alfred Hitchcock Presents.  Markle was let go after having completed eight episodes, and replaced by Maxwell Shane.  Shane continued in the crime drama mold, though he began to add trappings of gothic horror to a few stories, but he too was replaced after having completed a further nine episodes.  The rest of the first season and all of the second was produced by William Frye, who firmly moved Thriller into the format for which it would be most well-remembered, although non-horror crime and mystery stories would still be featured from time to time throughout the show's run.

Among the many writers for the series were Donald S. Sanford, Robert Hardy Andrews, and Robert Bloch, who adapted a number of his own stories, notably "The Weird Tailor".  Authors whose works were frequently adapted included August Derleth, Charlotte Armstrong and Cornell Woolrich.

In addition to serving as the host of the series, Karloff also starred in five episodes: "The Prediction", "The Premature Burial", "The Last of the Sommervilles", "Dialogues With Death", and "The Incredible Doctor Markesan".

Other actors included Leslie Nielsen in the show's first episode "The Twisted Image", William Shatner in two episodes, "The Hungry Glass" and "The Grim Reaper", Constance Ford in two episodes, Mary Tyler Moore in two episodes, Henry Daniell in five episodes, and Edward Andrews in three episodes. Child actress Beverly Washburn appeared in "Parasite Mansion"; Joan Tompkins appeared in "The Cheaters" and "Mr. George". Elizabeth Montgomery, Tom Poston, and John Carradine in "Masquerade". Carradine also starred in "The Remarkable Mrs. Hawk", co-starring Bruce Dern and Jo Van Fleet; Ed Nelson starred in four episodes: "The Fatal Impulse", "The Cheaters", "A Good Imagination", and "Dialogues With Death".

Other performers included: Rip Torn, George Grizzard, Natalie Trundy, Bethel Leslie, Patricia Medina, Patricia Barry, Richard Anderson, Richard Chamberlain, Elisha Cook, Conrad Nagel, Larry Pennell, Russell Johnson, Diana Millay, Philip Carey, Kathleen Crowley, Susan Oliver, Rodolfo Hoyos, Jr., J. Pat O'Malley,  Robert Vaughn, Marlo Thomas, John Ireland, Jeanette Nolan, Virginia Gregg, Hazel Scott, Lloyd Bochner, Scott Marlowe, Judson Pratt, Olive Sturgess, Mary Astor, Marion Ross, Hazel Court, MacDonald Carey, Donna Douglas, Natalie Schafer, Phyllis Thaxter, Estelle Winwood, Antoinette Bower, Jane Greer, Dick York, Jocelyn Brando, Richard Carlson, William Windom, George Kennedy, Cloris Leachman, Monte Markham, Nancy Kelly, Patricia Breslin and Edward Binns.

In Danse Macabre, Stephen King's 1981 history and critique of horror fiction, King suggests that Thriller was the best series of its kind up to that point.

Alfred Hitchcock hastened the demise of the series after he came aboard on NBC with The Alfred Hitchcock Hour, an expanded one-hour version of his previous half-hour series Alfred Hitchcock Presents. Hitchcock apparently did not want two similar one-hour shows on at the same time.

In a review of the anthology's 2010 DVD release, The Hollywood Reporter said "Not all the episodes work, and the transfers can be a bit grainy. But when they do—the strong shadows living in the black and white, the awesomely overwrought score by composers Jerry Goldsmith and Morton Stevens (if only they had music like that again), the storytelling not using gore and cheap scares as crutches—the results are genuinely goosebump-inducing."

Episodes 
Due to a number of TV stations that pre-empted Thriller in favor of local programs, Thriller only ran for two seasons starting September 1960. A few minutes into each episode, Boris Karloff introduces the title of the episode, the "major players" (actors) in that episode, and states that "as sure as my name is Boris Karloff, this is a thriller!" Karloff also appeared as an actor in five episodes over the duration of the series.

Season 1 (1960–61)
The show premiered on September 13, 1960 with the episode "The Twisted Image". It had 37 episodes in the first season (in addition to serving as the host of the series, Karloff starred in one episode in the first season: "The Prediction").

Season 2 (1961–62)
The second season of Thriller started on September 18, 1961 with the episode "What Beckoning Ghost?" and had 30 episodes in the season
(in addition to serving as the host of the series, Karloff starred in four episodes in the 2nd season:  "The Premature Burial," "The Last of the Sommervilles," "Dialogues With Death," and "The Incredible Doctor Markesan").

Musical score

First soundtrack

Each episode of the first season featured a specially composed score; the main theme and majority of writing was by Pete Rugolo, with additional compositions by Jerry Goldsmith and Morton Stevens. In 1961, The Original Music of Thriller, composed, arranged and conducted by Rugolo, was released on Bob Shad's Time label.

Track listing
All compositions by Pete Rugolo.
 "Theme from "Thriller"" – 1:33
 "The Hungry Glass" – 4:14
 "Voodoo Man" – 2:55
 "The Guilty Men" – 3:06
 "Girl With a Secret" – 2:24
 "The Purple Room" – 2:40
 "Twisted Image" – 1:47
 "Rose's Last Summer" – 2:42
 "Worse Than Murder" – 2:04
 "Child's Play" – 2:13
 "Finger of Fear" – 3:31
 "The Man in the Middle" – 2:55

Personnel
Pete Rugolo – arranger, conductor
Frank Beach, Don Fagerquist, Ollie Mitchell, Uan Rasey – trumpet 
Milt Bernhart, Dick Nash, Frank Rosolino – trombone
George Roberts – bass trombone
James Decker, Vincent DeRosa, Richard Perissi – French horn
Gene Cipriano, Bob Cooper, Norman Herzberg, Harry Klee, Ronnie Lang, Bud Shank – piccolo, flute, bass flute, bass clarinet, alto saxophone, baritone saxophone, bassoon
Red Callender – tuba
Laurindo Almeida, Robert Bain – guitar
Red Mitchell, Joe Mondragon – bass
Caesar Giovannini, Jimmy Rowles – piano
Jack Cookerly – organ
Dorothy Remsen – harp
Larry Bunker, Frank Flynn, Milt Holland, Louis Singer, Alvin Stoller – percussion, vibraphone, marimba, xylophone, timpani, congas, bongos, snare drum, bells, chimes, gong, triangle, temple blocks, jawbone, gourd, timbales, maracas
Herman Clebanoff, Sam Freed, Benny Gill, Mort Herbert, Anatol Kaminsky, Nathan Kaproff, Lou Klass, Marvin Limonick, William Miller, Alexander Murray, Erno Neufeld, Irma Neumann, Jack Pepper, Lou Raderman, Ambrose Russo, Leon Trebacz – violin
Justin Di Tullio, Armand Kaproff, Raphael Kramer, Edgar Lustgarten, Marie Manahan, Joseph Saxon, Harold Schneier, Eleanor Slatkin – cello

Second soundtrack
After a creative change during the first season, Rugolo was one of the crew to be removed (although his theme music was retained). Goldsmith and Stevens replaced him, scoring the rest of the run between them.

The British label Tadlow Music released two albums featuring several of Goldsmith's scores, re-recorded by City of Prague Philharmonic Orchestra and conducted by Nic Raine.

First Tadlow CD released in 2017:

 The Grim Reaper – Prologue (1:49)
 The Grim Reaper – Suite (7:22)
 The Grim Reaper – End Titles (1:20)
 Hay-Fork And Bill-Hook – Prologue (2:30)
 Hay-Fork And Bill-Hook – Suite (6:15)
 Hay-Fork And Bill-Hook – Finale (1:27)
 Well Of Doom – Prologue (1:37)
 Well Of Doom – Suite (8:42)
 Well Of Doom – Reunited (0:55)
 Mr. George – Prologue (1:29)
 Mr. George – Suite (7:06)
 Mr. George – The Swing (0:53)
 The Poisoner – Prologue (1:06)
 The Poisoner – Suite (8:22)
 The Poisoner – End Titles (0:57)
 Yours Truly, Jack The Ripper – Prologue (2:38)
 Yours Truly, Jack The Ripper – Suite (6:51)
 Yours Truly, Jack The Ripper – “Not John, Jack” (0:26)
 End Titles – Suite (8:24)

Second Tadlow CD released in 2018:

 GOD GRANTE THAT SHE LYE STILLE – Prologue / Roll Call (1:46)
 GOD GRANTE THAT SHE LYE STILLE – Suite (13:53) Silly Dog / The Search / Apparition / Locked Doors / Historical Records / I’ve Won
 THE BRIDE WHO DIED TWICE – Prologue / Roll Call (3:14)
 THE BRIDE WHO DIED TWICE – Suite (6:46) Consuelo / Respect / Bad News / Wedding Guests / Shot
 LATE DATE – Prologue / Roll Call (2:09)
 LATE DATE – Suite (8:58) Aftermath / “It Was You” / The Plant / Confession
 THE WEIRD TAILOR – Prologue / Roll Call (2:05)
 THE WEIRD TAILOR – Suite (10:03) Finest Material / “Leave Me Alone” / Late Work / Delivery / The Freezer / “Not So Idle Hans”
 MASQUERADE – Prologue / Roll Call (1:53)
 MASQUERADE – Suite (10:38) Up the Stairs / Every Man for Himself / Spoil Sports! / Honeymooners / The Cellar / Escape / Coffin Made for Two
 TERROR IN TEAKWOOD – Prologue / Roll Call (2:18)
 TERROR IN TEAKWOOD – Suite (5:09) The Box / Ground Plaster Cast / Fist Fight
 TERROR IN TEAKWOOD – Nocturne for Violin and Piano (4:30) Composed by Caesar Giovaninni Violin: Lucie Svehlova / Piano: Jaromir Klepac

Award nominations

Comic book 
Gold Key Comics published a comic book version of Thriller, beginning in October 1962.

The title changed to Boris Karloff: Tales of Mystery after the TV series ended; the comic book series lasted until the very end of 1979, long after the death of Karloff himself. Dark Horse Comics published an archive reprint of the series beginning in 2009.

Home media
On August 31, 2010, Image Entertainment released Thriller: The Complete Series on DVD in Region 1. The 14-disc set contains all 67 episodes, remastered and uncut, with new commentary tracks and separated music tracks.

References

External links 
 
 A Thriller a Day Peter Enfantino and John Scoleri review each and every episode of Boris Karloff's Thriller
 Thriller guide Summary of each episode
 Thriller at CVTA
 "The Return of Andrew Bentley" Public domain episode at the Internet Archive

1960 American television series debuts
1962 American television series endings
1960s American anthology television series
American horror fiction television series
American thriller television series
Black-and-white American television shows
Crime thriller television series
English-language television shows
NBC original programming
Television shows adapted into comics
Television series by Universal Television
Boris Karloff